Convergent Linux Platform or CLP for short is an initiative of a la Mobile, inc. to present to the market a Linux-embedded mobile phone with raised security issues as well as the first Linux-based smart phone operating system.

References

External links 
 http://www.a-la-mobile.com/solutions/convergent.html
 Startup plans "complete" Linux smartphone OS on Linuxdevices.com

Embedded operating systems
Embedded Linux distributions